Caldo de siete mares (in English, "seven seas soup"), also known as caldo de mariscos ("seafood soup") is a Mexican version of fish stew, popular in coastal regions in Mexico.  It is typically made with chicken, tomato, fish, or seafood broth with local fresh seafood ingredients and, like other Mexican soups, cooked quickly in a thin broth.

See also
 List of Mexican dishes
 List of soups
 List of stews

References

Mexican stews
Mexican soups
Fish and seafood soups